Tim Wilson (January 14, 1954  – November 23, 1996) was an American football running back in the National Football League (NFL) for the Houston Oilers and New Orleans Saints. He was a lead blocker for Hall of Fame running back Earl Campbell. He played college football at the University of Maryland. His son Josh Wilson played in the NFL.

In 1991, Wilson was inducted into the Delaware Sports Museum and Hall of Fame.

Family ties
Wilson's son, Josh, also played for Maryland and was drafted by the Seattle Seahawks in the 2nd round of the 2007 NFL Draft.

1954 births
1996 deaths
African-American players of American football
American football running backs
Maryland Terrapins football players
Houston Oilers players
New Orleans Saints players
Players of American football from Delaware
People from New Castle, Delaware
20th-century African-American sportspeople